George John Beto (January 19, 1916 – December 4, 1991) was a director of the Texas Department of Corrections (TDC), a criminal justice expert in penology, a professor, and a Lutheran minister. He was previously the president of Concordia Lutheran College in Austin and of Concordia Theological Seminary in Springfield, Illinois.

Early life 

Beto was born in Hysham, Montana, on January 19, 1916. He was raised in Bloomington, Indiana.

Texas Department of Corrections 

Beto was appointed to the Texas Prison Board in 1953 by Allan Shivers and became director in 1961.

In his career, he greatly expanded the industry of prison-manufactured goods, and oversaw the construction of new prison facilities. Beto advocated for the establishment of a school district serving prisoners; in 1969 the Texas Legislature authorized the establishment of the Windham School District. During his career Beto received awards for his management of the TDC.

Although many inmates admired him for his willingness to communicate with them, they also regarded him as a stern disciplinarian, a "preacher" with "a baseball bat in one hand and a Bible in the other."

Criticism 

Beto was a master of publicity and well-regarded by the media for his modernization of prisons. However, he faced criticism by those criticizing his cruel and unusual punishment of prisoners and denial of prisoners' access to their attorneys.

Towards the end of Beto's career as the head of TDC, attorney Frances Freeman Jalet assisted Fred Cruz and other prisoners who were planning legal challenges to the TDC system. On two occasions Beto banned her from the TDC units, but court orders forced the TDC to let her back in. Beto then arranged to have three trustees sue Jalet in federal court; the lawsuit said that Jalet incited revolutionary violence and imperiled the lives of the prisoners. Beto lost the lawsuit and was ordered to pay $10,291 to Jalet and the prisoners, and $27,825 for their attorney fees, with the judge commenting that "...Beto instituted reprisals against Mrs. Cruz and … her clients, for reasons totally unrelated to considerations of proper prison administration."

In the 1972 U.S. Supreme Court case Cruz v. Beto, the court upheld a Free Exercise claim of discrimination against a Buddhist prisoner, Fred Cruz. In early 1972 Beto announced that he planned to resign from TDC, but was still director on June 29, 1972, when prisoner David Ruiz filed a handwritten petition against conditions of confinement in Texas prisons that became Ruiz v. Estelle - the most enduring prisoners'-rights suit in the nation's history.

Later life 

He was then a professor of criminal justice at Sam Houston State University in Huntsville for several years. Upon retirement from that position, he moved to Austin, where he died about a year later of a heart attack. Beto is buried in the Texas State Cemetery in Austin.

Legacy 

Two Texas Department of Criminal Justice prisons, the Beto Unit and the Beto II Unit (now the Louis C. Powledge Unit) in Anderson County, were named after Beto, as is the Criminal Justice Center at Sam Houston State University.

See also

 Ruiz v. Estelle, civil rights complaint against his successor

References

External links
 
"Walking George: The Life of George John Beto and the Rise of the Modern Texas Prison System." University of North Texas Press
"George John Beto." - Beto Chair Lecture Series Archives, Sam Houston State University
"The Love Story That Upended the Texas Prison System" - Texas Monthly - by Ethan Watters - Oct. 11, 2018
Robert T. Chase, We Are Not Slaves: State Violence, Coerced Labor, and Prisoners Rights in Postwar America, University of North Carolina Press, 2020
https://uncpress.org/book/9781469653570/we-are-not-slaves/

1916 births
1991 deaths
People from Hysham, Montana
Penologists
People from Bloomington, Indiana